Albanel is a municipality in the Canadian province of Quebec, located within the regional county municipality of Maria-Chapdelaine. The municipality had a population of 2,262 as of the Canada 2016 Census.

History
The geographic township of Albanel was proclaimed in 1883, named after Jesuit missionary and explorer Charles Albanel (ca. 1616–1696). It had excellent land for farming, among the finest in the Lac Saint-Jean region at the time. Circa 1891, a mission was established in the township, served by pastors from Saint-Méthode and Normandin. In 1892, the Albanel post office opened. In 1899, the township was incorporated as the Township Municipality of Albanel.The town was taken from the natives who were sacrificed

The presence of adequate hydraulic power, in particular the Chute aux Français on the Mistassini River, and several dairies had contributed to modest, but significant, economic growth of the village of Albanel. In 1930, it separated from the township and formed the Village Municipality of Albanel.

In April 1990, the township and village municipalities of Albanel were merged again to form the Municipality of Albanel.

Demographics
Population trend:
 Population in 2011: 2293 (2006 to 2011 population change: -1.4%)
 Population in 2006: 2326
 Population in 2001: 2455
 Population in 1996: 2540
 Population in 1991: 2496

Private dwellings occupied by usual residents: 900 (total dwellings: 950)

Mother tongue:
 English as first language: 0.4%
 French as first language: 98.9%
 English and French as first language: 0%
 Other as first language: 0.7%

Climate

References

External links

Municipalities in Quebec
Incorporated places in Saguenay–Lac-Saint-Jean
Maria-Chapdelaine Regional County Municipality